Anne Kremer was the defending champion but lost in the quarterfinals to Marlene Weingärtner.

Meilen Tu won in the final 7–6 (12–10), 6–2 against Paola Suárez.

Seeds
A champion seed is indicated in bold text while text in italics indicates the round in which that seed was eliminated.

Draw

Qualifying

Seeds
The top three seeds received a bye to the second round.

Qualifiers

Draw

First qualifier

Second qualifier

Third qualifier

Fourth qualifier

References
 2001 ASB Classic Draw

WTA Auckland Open
2001 WTA Tour